The Indian Railways SP class is a class of Indian steam locomotives used for passenger trains which was built around 1905. In the designation SP stands for Standard Passenger. The design originated from a BESA standard.

History

The standard SP series for passenger transport was presented in the first edition of the 1903 BESA standard. The 4-4-0 ("American") wheel arrangement with a leading bogie has already proven itself in India because it shows good smoothness even in poor track conditions.

The locomotives were delivered to different railways, but only the Indian States Railways (ISR) operated railways used the type designation SP. Beyer-Peacock delivered a series of 10 pieces to the North Western Railway (NWR), whose route network lay in today's border area of India and Pakistan.

Design
The locomotive was a two-cylinder saturated engine design with a Belpaire firebox. The grate was arranged between the coupled wheel sets. Between the frames were the two cylinders and the Walschaerts valve gear.  A small cowcatcher was attached to the from buffer beam. The cab was completely enclosed, with the cab rear wall being formed by the three-axle tender.

A later version was created equipped with a superheater and designated SPS (Standard Passenger, Superheated); SP locomotives retro-fitted with superheaters were usually reclassified as SPC (Standard Passenger, Converted) An SPS locomotive, most recently operated by the Pakistan Railways is preserved in the Museum of Science and Industry (MOSI) in Manchester. The exterior of the locomotive is practically identical to that of the SP series.

See also
Indian Railways
Rail transport in India#History
Locomotives of India
Rail transport in India

References

Steam locomotives of India
5 ft 6 in gauge locomotives
4-4-0 locomotives
Vulcan Foundry locomotives
Robert Stephenson and Hawthorns locomotives
Freight locomotives
Passenger locomotives
Scrapped locomotives
NBL locomotives